Sargocentron bullisi, more commonly known as the deepwater squirrelfish, is a nocturnal, reef-associated predator of the family Holocentridae. It is native to the West Atlantic from North Carolina, USA to southern Brazil and throughout the Caribbean Sea. It can reach sizes of up to  SL.

References

External links
 

bullisi
Fish described in 1955
Fish of the Atlantic Ocean